is a railway station in the city of Iiyama, Nagano Prefecture, Japan operated by East Japan Railway Company (JR East).

Lines
Nishi-Ōtaki Station is served by the Iiyama Line, and is 39.7 kilometers from the starting point of the line at Toyono Station.

Station layout
The station consists of one ground-level side platform serving a single bi-directional track. The station is unattended.

History
Nishi-Ōtaki Station opened on 1 December 1923.  With the privatization of Japanese National Railways (JNR) on 1 April 1987, the station came under the control of JR East. A new station building was completed in 1997.

Surrounding area
Chikuma River

Nishiotaki Dam

See also
 List of railway stations in Japan

References

External links

 JR East station information 

Railway stations in Nagano Prefecture
Iiyama Line
Railway stations in Japan opened in 1923
Iiyama, Nagano